The Archives Nationales du Congo are the national archives of the Republic of the Congo. It is located in Brazzaville.

See also 

 List of national archives

References 

Congo, Republic of the
Archives in the Republic of the Congo